Agnieszka Radwańska was the defending champion, but withdrew before her quarterfinal match with a right thigh injury.

Peng Shuai, a Tianjin native, won her first WTA singles title, defeating Alison Riske in the final, 7–6(7–3), 6–2.

Seeds

Draw

Finals

Top half

Bottom half

Qualifying

Seeds

Qualifiers

Draw

First qualifier

Second qualifier

Third qualifier

Fourth qualifier

Fifth qualifier

Sixth qualifier

References
Main Draw
Qualifying Draw

Tianjin Open - Singles
Tianjin Open